Gray County is a county located in the U.S. state of Texas. As of the 2020 census, its population was 21,227. The county seat is Pampa. The county was created in 1876 and later organized in 1902. is named for Peter W. Gray, a Confederate lawyer and soldier in the American Civil War.

Gray County comprises the Pampa, TX micropolitan statistical area.

Gray County was the center of the White Deer Lands Management Company, which ceased operations in 1957. The history of the company is the theme of the White Deer Land Museum in Pampa, but company archives are at the Panhandle-Plains Historical Museum in Canyon. Timothy Dwight Hobart, the White Deer land agent from 1903 to 1924, was elected mayor of Pampa in 1927.

Geography

Major highways
  Interstate 40
  U.S. Highway 60
  State Highway 70
  State Highway 152
  State Highway 273

Adjacent counties
 Roberts County (north)
 Hemphill county (northeast)
 Wheeler County (east)
 Collingsworth County (southeast)
 Donley County (south)
 Armstrong County (southwest)
 Carson County (west)

National protected area
 McClellan Creek National Grassland

Demographics

Note: the US Census treats Hispanic/Latino as an ethnic category. This table excludes Latinos from the racial categories and assigns them to a separate category. Hispanics/Latinos can be of any race.

As of the census of 2000,  22,744 people, 8,793 households, and 6,049 families were residing in the county.  The population density was 24 people per square mile (9/km2).  The 10,567 housing units averaged 11 per mi2 (4/km2).  The racial makeup of the county was 82.15% White, 5.85% African American, 0.94% Native American, 0.39% Asian, 8.25% from other races, and 2.42% from two or more races. About  13.01% of the population was Hispanic or Latino of any race.

Of the 8,793 households, 30.00% had children under the age of 18 living with them, 57.00% were married couples living together, 9.00% had a female householder with no husband present, and 31.20% were not families. About 28.70% of all households were made up of individuals, and 15.30% had someone living alone who was 65 years of age or older.  The average household size was 2.39, and the average family size was 2.93.

In the county, the age distribution was 24.00% under 18, 8.40% from 18 to 24, 27.20% from 25 to 44, 22.30% from 45 to 64, and 18.10% who were 65 or older.  The median age was 39 years. For every 100 females, there were 104.00 males.  For every 100 females age 18 and over, there were 103.70 males.

The median income for a household in the county was $31,368, and for a family was $40,019. Males had a median income of $32,401 versus $20,158 for females. The per capita income for the county was $16,702.  About 11.20% of families and 13.80% of the population were below the poverty line, including 17.60% of those under age 18 and 9.60% of those age 65 or over.

Communities

City
 Pampa (county seat)

Town
 Lefors
 McLean

Census-designated places
 Alanreed

Other unincorporated communities
Back
Hoover

Politics
Prior to 1952, Gray County was primarily Democratic similar to most of Texas and the Solid South. The county only gave a Republican presidential candidate a majority before 1952 in 1928, when Herbert Hoover won the county due to anti-Catholic sentiment towards Al Smith. Starting with the 1952 election, the county has become a Republican stronghold along with the rest of the Texas Panhandle. This level of Republican dominance has increased in recent years, as every Republican presidential candidate in the second millennium has racked up 80% of the county's vote. Additionally, after the 2008 election, Democrats Barack Obama, Hillary Clinton, and Joe Biden have failed to win even 1,000 votes total in the county.

Notable people
 Phil Cates, state representative from 1971 to 1979, was born in Pampa in 1947.
 Tom Mechler, state Republican Party chairman since 2015, is a former Gray County Republican chairman.
 Kae T. Patrick, a native of Gray County, served in the Texas House of Representatives from San Antonio from 1981 to 1988.

See also

 List of museums in the Texas Panhandle
 National Register of Historic Places listings in Gray County, Texas
 Recorded Texas Historic Landmarks in Gray County

References

External links
 Gray County government's website
 
 Gray County Profile from the Texas Association of Counties 

 
1902 establishments in Texas
Populated places established in 1902
Pampa, Texas micropolitan area
Texas Panhandle